Radiša Čubrić (born 24 July 1962) is a Serbian former cyclist. He competed in the individual road race at the 1992 Summer Olympics.

References

1962 births
Living people
Serbian male cyclists
Yugoslav male cyclists
Olympic cyclists as Independent Olympic Participants
Cyclists at the 1992 Summer Olympics
Sportspeople from Kraljevo